Thornton le Moor is a village in the civil parish of Owersby  in the West Lindsey district of Lincolnshire, England, situated approximately  south-west from the town of Caistor. Between 1866 and 1936 Thornton le Moor was a separate civil parish.

Near the village are the remains of the deserted medieval villages of Beasthorpe  and Cauthorpe. In the Domesday Book of 1086 Thornton le Moor is written as "Torentone", consisting of eighteen households.

The parish church is dedicated to All Saints and is a Grade II* listed ironstone building dating from the 11th century. It was restored 1871. There is a fragment of an 11th-century  limestone cross shaft built into the back of an aumbry in the north wall of the chancel.

References

External links

Villages in Lincolnshire
West Lindsey District